Chukwudi Iwuji  (born 15 October 1975) is a Nigerian-British actor. He is an Associate Artist for the Royal Shakespeare Company.

Early life and education
Iwuji is one of five Nigerian siblings born to diplomat parents. When Iwuji was age 10, they joined the United Nations, and the family moved to Ethiopia. At age 12, Iwuji was sent to boarding school in England. Between 1987 and 1993, he was a student at Caterham School, Surrey. He was elected Head Boy, the first Black student to be so in the school's history. He then attended Yale University and earned his undergraduate degree in economics in 1997. He attended the Professional Theatre Training Program (PTTP) at The University of Milwaukee - Wisconsin in 2000. He then moved back to the United Kingdom.

Theatre
Iwuji began to perform at the Royal Shakespeare Company in 2001.  He had roles in Edward Hall's production of Julius Caesar and as Claudius in Hamlet, both in 2001. In 2002, he played Fenton in The Merry Wives of Windsor and Aufidius in Coriolanus. In 2006, he replaced David Oyelowo in the title role of the Henry VI trilogy in the revival of the This England: The Histories project). Iwuji described the role, "In Henry VI, the musicality is different: the thoughts are very structured." The production won the Olivier Award for Best Revival.

In 2013, Iwuji played Enobarbus in the Caribbean-themed Antony and Cleopatra directed by Tarell Alvin McCraney that was a joint production between the RSC and The Public Theater in New York.  In 2014, he played Edgar in King Lear. In 2016, he played Hamlet for The Public's Mobile Unit, and he described his portrayal of the role as "this ugly, relentless beast that’s about to be unleashed." In 2018, he starred as Othello at the Delacorte Theater for Shakespeare in the Park opposite Corey Stoll as Iago, and as Blanke in The Low Road at the Public.

Iwuji has worked with numerous other theaters. In 2002, he was in Peter Hall 's Bacchai at the Royal National Theatre. He played Booth in Topdog/Underdog Christy in Playboy of the Western World at the Abbey Theatre in Dublin, Julian in Thea Sharrock's production of The Misanthrope, and played in the large cast of The Vote at the Donmar Warehouse in 2015. He performed at the Royal National Theatre in Welcome to Thebes in 2010, the Old Vic in a 2011 Richard III, in 2014 off-Broadway in Tamburlaine for which theater critic Ben Brantley called him "a standout," and in 2016-17 with director Ivo van Hove in both Obsession and Hedda Gabbler.

Television
Iwuji appeared on a number of shows, including Barry Jenkins's 2021 The Underground Railroad. In 2018, became a series regular on the legal drama The Split. That year, he played the King of France for the BBC recording of King Lear starring Anthony Hopkins, Emma Thompson, and Florence Pugh. He had a recurring role on Netflix's When They See Us and Designated Survivor in 2019, and starred in Peacemaker in 2022.

Film
Iwuji was in the 2016 film Barry and played Akoni in John Wick: Chapter 2 in 2017. In 2022, it was announced that Iwuji would play the High Evolutionary in the 2023 film Guardians of the Galaxy Vol. 3.

Awards
2018 Lucille Lortel - nominated for Lead Actor in a Play
2018 - Obie Award Winner - Performance for The Low Road (play)
2018 Drama League Award Nominee, Distinguished Performance for The Low Road (play)

Personal life
Iwuji lives in New York with his wife, actress/singer Angela Travino.

Filmography

Film

Television

References

External links

 Chuk Iwuji, Sunday Times, August 13, 2006

British male stage actors
Nigerian male stage actors
Living people
Nigerian emigrants to the United Kingdom
1975 births
British male television actors
21st-century Nigerian male actors
Nigerian male television actors
British male Shakespearean actors
Nigerian radio actors
Nigerian male film actors
University of Wisconsin–Milwaukee alumni
Yale University alumni
Igbo people